The South Tyrolean Army Group (German: Heeresgruppe Südtirol) was an army group of the Austro-Hungarian Army, which operated in South Tyrol against Italy, between 1 March 1917 and the end of World War I. It was also called Army Group Conrad (German: Heeresgruppe Conrad) and Army Group Archduke Joseph (German: Heeresgruppe Erzherzog Joseph) after its commanders.

1917–1918 

The Army Group participated in support of the German 14th Army during the Battle of Caporetto (October–November 1917) but it was badly defeated during the Battle of the Piave River (June 1918). The Army Group disintegrated during the Battle of Vittorio Veneto (October–November 1918).

Composition 
 Austro-Hungarian 10th Army (Alexander von Krobatin)
 Austro-Hungarian 11th Army (Viktor Graf von Scheuchenstuel)

Commanders
 Franz Conrad von Hötzendorf (1 March 1917 – 14 July 1918)
 Archduke Joseph August of Austria (15 July 1918 – 26 October 1918)
 Alexander von Krobatin (26 October 1918 – 3 November 1918)

Sources

 Austro-Hungarian Army, Higher Commands and Commanders

Army units and formations of Austria-Hungary in World War I
1917 establishments in Austria-Hungary
Military units and formations established in 1917
Military units and formations disestablished in 1918
Army groups of Austria-Hungary